Epichorista abdita is a species of moth in the family Tortricidae. It is found in New Zealand.

The wingspan is 11.5–13 mm. The forewings are bright ochreous reddish with obscure markings, consisting of five to six fuscous dots on the basal half of the costa and traces of leaden-white fasciae. The hindwings are dark fuscous.

References

Moths described in 1924
Epichorista
Moths of New Zealand